Two sports have events that fall under the name of weight throw one being the track and field event and the other being the Scottish highland games events.

The track and field event is most popular in the United States as an indoor equivalent to the hammer throw event, which can only be held outdoors. The 35 lb weight throw (men) and 20 lb weight throw (women) are not recognised by the International Association of Athletics Federations.

The Scottish Highland Games contain two weight throwing events. In the one event the weight, 28 lb or 56 lb, is thrown in a similar manner to a discus. In the other event, the 56 lb weight gets thrown over a bar for height.

Weight throw for distance
The 56-pound weight throw was conducted twice at the Olympic Games, in 1904 and in 1920.

All-time top 25
O = Outdoor performance
A = affected by altitude

Men

Notes
Below is a list of additional performances (excluding ancillary throws) equal or superior to 24.48 m:
Kibwé Johnson also threw  (2007).
Daniel Haugh also threw   (2020),  (2022),  (2020).
Mike Lihrman also threw  (2015).
Conor McCullough also threw  (2018).

Women

Notes
Below is a list of additional (indoor) performances (excluding ancillary throws) equal or superior to 24.20 m:
Shey Taiwo also threw   (2022).
Brooke Andersen also threw   (2023).
Annette Echikunwoke also threw   (2023).
Erin Reese also threw   (2023).

Note that Gwen Berry threw 24.35 m in 2016 but the performance was annulled due to violation of anti-doping procedures

International competition
The event, held outdoors and indoors, is a World Championship and world record event in World Masters Athletics.  Outdoors, it is also the final event of the Throws pentathlon.  Masters athletics has different weight specifications for different age groups.

Indoor event
The weight throw is an indoor track and field event, predominately in the US. The technique implemented to throw the weight is similar to that of the hammer throw in outdoor competition. In international competition, the men's weight is a 35 lb ball (25 for high school) with a D-ring or triangle handle attached directly to the weight. The technique in wide use is to start in a throwing circle with the thrower's back to the landing area. The weight is then swung overhead to gain momentum before transitioning into the spinning position. The thrower then turns heel to toe up to four times across the ring and toward the front of the circle. At the front of the circle, the thrower releases the weight over his/her shoulder and into the landing area. The landing area is a sector of 34.92° which is identical to the Hammer throw, Discus throw and Shot Put.  Because of the demands of the landing area, USATF rules allow for the event as part of an indoor meet to be held outdoors.  The world best for men is 25.41 m (outdoor) and 25.86 m (84'10") (indoor) and is held by American Lance Deal. For women, who throw a weight of 20 lb, the world best is 24.57 m (80'07½") (outdoor) set by Brittany Riley of Southern Illinois University on 27 January 2007 and 25.60 m (indoor), by Gwen Berry, on 4 March 2017.

The weight throw event has had an enduring history in American track and field. It was a national championship event for men outdoors from 1878 to 1965. Despite the decline of such outdoor contests in the United States, the event has been a mainstay of the USA Indoor Track and Field Championships: the men's 35 lb event has been held from 1932 to present and a women's 20 lb weight throw event was introduced in 1991. The weight throw is also present on the event programme of the NCAA Men's and NCAA Women's Indoor Track and Field Championships.

The Superweight Throw uses implements similar in construction to the regular weight throw but with heavier implements. The event was part of two Olympic Games in 1904 and 1920. Though no longer officially sanctioned by the IAAF, it still is contested as a novelty event at various competitions, including the USATF Master's Indoor Championship.

Highland games
In the Highland Games, the weight throw consists of two separate events, the light weight and the heavy weight. In both cases, the implement consists of a steel or lead weight (usually spherical or cylindrical) attached by a short chain to a metal handle. The handle may be a d-ring, a triangle or a ring. The size of the weight depends on the class of the competition.

For advanced male athletes, the light weight is 28 lb, or two stone (12.7 kg). The heavy weight is 56 lb, or four stone (25.4 kg). For all female athletes, the weights are 14 and 28 lb (6.35 and 12.7 kg). For male master class or senior athletes, the weights are 28 and 42 lb (12.7 and 19.05 kg).

The weight is thrown one-handed from a rectangular (4.5 feet by 9 feet) area behind a toe board or trig. The athlete must stay behind the trig at all times during the throw. The techniques vary, but usually involve a turning or spinning motion to increase momentum before the release. Each athlete gets three attempts, with places determined by the best throw.

Weight Throw Record (28 lb): Gregor Edmunds, 95 ft 10 in Markinch, Scotland, 2011.

Weight throw for height

The weight over the bar, or weight throw for height, is contested at highland games in Scotland and elsewhere, and at track and field events in Ireland.

The weight is thrown one-handed over a bar set at increasing heights above the thrower. Similar to the high jump or pole vault, the thrower has three attempts for each successive height. Places are determined by maximum height reached with the fewest misses.

The size of the weight varies with the competition class. Advanced male athletes throw a 25 kg (56 lb. or four stone) weight, female athletes throw a 12 kg (28 lb.) weight and male master class or senior athletes throw a 19 kg (42 lb). weight.  There are two techniques for this event. The classic technique swings the weight between the legs before pulling the weight up and directly overhead. The alternate technique (which is not allowed in some games) involves a spinning motion, with the athlete throwing from the side.

Ireland
Athletics Ireland recognises the weight throw for height and distance. The weight is 56 lbs at senior level, and 35 lbs in underage level. It is mainly a men's event, though women's weight throw for distance is contested at university level. The height event proceeds in a manner similar to the high jump and pole vault, with throwers required to clear a bar progressively raised. The Irish records are:
 height: 4.93 m (Gerry O'Connell, 1986)
 distance: 9.16 m (John Menton, 1998)

In Ireland, a 56 lb weight is used for both height and distance weight throw events.

References

 
Highland games
Individual sports
Events in track and field
Throwing sports
Discontinued Summer Olympic disciplines in athletics
Indoor track and field
Strength sports